The 1984 NCAA Division I women's volleyball tournament was the fourth year of the NCAA Women's Volleyball Championship. It began with 28 teams and ended on December 16 when UCLA defeated Stanford 3 games to 2 in the NCAA championship match.

UCLA claimed the program's first NCAA national title after two previous runner-up finishes. In the deciding fifth game against Stanford, UCLA was down 12-4, but with heroics from Liz Masakayan, the Bruins scored 11 straight points and eventually won the game 15-13.

In the consolation match, Pacific defeated San Jose State to claim third place.

Brackets

West regional

Mideast regional

South regional

Northwest regional

Final Four - Pauley Pavilion, Los Angeles, California

See also
NCAA Women's Volleyball Championship

References

NCAA Women's Volleyball Championship
NCAA
Sports competitions in Los Angeles
NCAA Division I women's volleyball tournament
NCAA Division I women's volleyball tournament
Volleyball in California
Women's sports in California
Women in Los Angeles